Rodel N. de Leon (born March 9, 1992) is a Filipino professional basketball player for the TNT Tropang Giga of the Philippine Basketball Association (PBA).

Prior to turning professional, he played for the Cafe France-CEU Bakers of the PBA Developmental League (PBA D-League). He was drafted with the 39th overall pick in the 2015 PBA draft by the Star Hotshots. 

De Leon was part of the varsity teams of Far Eastern University from 2010 to 2012, but was relegated to Team B. He never got the chance to play in major collegiate tournaments, until he transferred to Centro Escolar University (CEU) in 2012.

He became one of the main men for the CEU Scorpions of the National Athletic Association of Schools, Colleges and Universities (NAASCU), where he was awarded the league MVP in 2014.

PBA career statistics

As of the end of 2020 season

Season-by-season averages

|-
| align=left | 
| align=left | Star
| 5 || 5.1 || .200 || .125 || .000 || 2.2 || .2 || .0 || .0 || 1.0
|-
| align=left | 
| align=left | TNT
| 16 || 9.2 || .382 || .267 || .667 || 1.4 || .6 || .1 || .2 || 2.0
|-
| align=left | 
| align=left | TNT
| 16 || 10.6 || .323 || .050 || .750 || 2.4 || .7 || .4 || .2 || 2.3
|-class=sortbottom
| align="center" colspan=2 | Career
| 37 || 9.2 || .333 || .140 || .739 || 2.0 || .6 || .2 || .2 || 2.0

References

1992 births
Living people
Basketball players from Nueva Ecija
Filipino men's basketball players
Small forwards
Magnolia Hotshots players
People from Cabanatuan
Maharlika Pilipinas Basketball League players
TNT Tropang Giga players
Magnolia Hotshots draft picks
Philippines national 3x3 basketball team players
PBA 3x3 players
Filipino men's 3x3 basketball players